Ashcroft Arts Centre is a performing arts venue in Fareham, Hampshire. It is named after Dame Peggy Ashcroft, and opened by her in 1989, after being refurbished from its original use as a school.

Since 2014, the arts centre has been operated by Hampshire Cultural Trust.

About 
The art centre comprises a 150-seat theatre, an art gallery, a dance studio, an art studio and a fully licensed café bar. It is funded by hire costs and ticketed events.

The venue also hosts live music, theatre performances craft workshops, as well as weekly, day time and evening classes. It also hosts the annual CAMRA approved ale festivals

References

External links 

 Ashcroft Arts Centre Website

Theatres in Hampshire
Arts centres in England